Calliostoma muriellae is a species of sea snail, a marine gastropod mollusk in the family Calliostomatidae.

Some authors place this taxon in the subgenus Calliostoma (Otukaia).

Description
The size of the shell varies between 22 mm and 35 mm.

Distribution
This species occurs in the Indian Ocean off Madagascar and Mozambique

References

 Vilvens C. (2001). Description of a new species of Calliostoma (Gastropoda: Trochidae: Calliostomatinae) from Madagascar. Novapex 2(4): 175-178

External links
 

muriellae
Gastropods described in 2001